The 2005 AFC Cup was the second edition of the AFC Cup, playing between clubs from nations who are members of the Asian Football Confederation.

Qualification

The 'developing' 9 nations in the Asian Football Confederation were invited to nominate one or two clubs to participate in the 2005 competition.

Central & West Asia

East Asia

Group stage
Key to colors in group tables:
Green: Group winners and best runners-up advance to the quarter finals.

Group A

Group B

Group C

Group D

Group E

Best runners-up

Three best runners-up qualify for the quarter finals.

Knockout stage

Quarter finals

|}

First leg

Second leg

Semi finals

|}

First leg

Second leg

Finals

|}

First leg

Second leg

See also

 AFC Champions League 2005

References

External links
 RSSF – AFC Cup 2005

2
AFC Cup seasons